Josef the Chaste is a 1930 German comedy film directed by Georg Jacoby and starring Harry Liedtke, Iwa Wanja, and Elga Brink.

It shares its title with an unrelated 1953 film of the same name by Carl Boese.

Cast
Harry Liedtke as Juccundus von Müller
Iwa Wanja as Irene
Elga Brink as Thekla
Ossi Oswalda as Kitty
Grete Natzler as Lolotte
Paul Heidemann as Hellmuth Heiligenstamm
Henry Bender as August Müller
Ida Wüst as Sylphide Schlump
Felix Bressart as Eizes
Paul Westermeier as Krause

References

External links

1930 comedy films
German comedy films
Films of the Weimar Republic
Films directed by Georg Jacoby
German black-and-white films
1930s German films
1930s German-language films